Daniel Fisher, Danny Fisher, or Dan Fisher may refer to:

Daniel Fisher (minister) (1731–1807), English Dissenting minister
Daniel Fisher (Australian politician) (1812–1884), MHA in South Australia
Daniel Fisher of The Cooper Temple Clause
 Dan Fisher (composer) on Private Passions
 Dan Fisher (soccer coach) for Long Island Rough Riders
 Daniel Fisher (Massachusetts politician) (died 1683), Speaker of the Massachusetts House of Deputies
 Daniel Fisher (Dedham), representative to the Great and General Court of Massachusetts
 Dan Fisher (politician) (born 1958), member of the Oklahoma House of Representatives
 Daniel Fisher (paleontologist), paleontologist at the University of Michigan
 Daniel Fisher (physicist) from Antoine Georges
 Daniel S. Fisher (born 1956), theoretical physicist working in statistical physics.
 Dan Fisher (volleyball), volleyball coach for the Pittsburgh Panthers
 Daniel Webster Fisher, 10th president of Hanover College
Danny Fisher, the fictional protagonist of the novel, A Stone for Danny Fisher

See also
Daniel Fischer (disambiguation)